Stephen Bronfman (born in Montreal) is a Canadian businessperson.

Early life 

A member of the Bronfman family, a prominent Quebec family, he is the son of billionaire Charles Bronfman and grandson of Samuel Bronfman and Saidye Rosner Bronfman.

Bronfman completed his undergraduate studies at Williams College and returned to Montreal in 1986. He briefly worked in the marketing department of the Montreal Expos, then owned by his father. In 1990, he studied geology at Concordia University.

Also in 1991, he joined private equity firm Claridge, which was founded by his father in 1987.

Career 

Bronfman took the head of the private equity firm Claridge and has served as its CEO since 1997. The firm has invested in artist tours by the Rolling Stones, Madonna, and Crosby, Stills, Nash and Young. Bronfman was responsible for increased investment positions in the high-end organic food and beverage industry, mainly through the creation of the Claridge Food Group. As executive chairman he has overseen the firm's direct private equity portfolio invest, amongst others, in :

– Cirque du Soleil, CPI, Dick Clark Productions, TSN, Solotech, The Next Adventure, 49TH Parallel, Champlain Seafood, Circle Foods, NYSE, Tour Telus, Bassins dy Havre, Eagle Creek, Busbud, Cloudify, Facebook, Gigaspaces, Luxury Retreats.

In 1999 he was named a director of Seagram, his family's conglomerate.

In 2010 he unsuccessfully tried to buy the Montreal Canadiens of the National Hockey League (NHL).

Since the departure of the Expos, he has been involved in initiatives aiming to bring Major League Baseball back to Montreal.

Bronfman was named in the Paradise Papers in 2017.

In December 2021, The Washington Post reported that Bronfman funded a Cayman Islands trust that is among the investors in Pretium Partners which is behind Progress Residential, a firm that "reaps big profits from stressed American renters amid national affordability crisis." The scheme was described as an effort to profit from the 2008 housing crisis by "buy[ing] tens of thousands of foreclosed homes across the U.S. sunbelt and rent[ing] them to heavily-indebted Americans who can’t get a mortgage."

Political ties 

Bronfman and his family came to prominence within Canada as key fundraisers for the Liberal Party of Canada.

References 

21st-century Canadian businesspeople
Stephen Bronfman
Businesspeople from Montreal
Living people
Williams College alumni
Year of birth missing (living people)